The Vicious Circle may refer to:

Film 
 The Vicious Circle (1948 film), an American drama film directed by W. Lee Wilder
 The Vicious Circle (1957 film), a British thriller film directed by Gerald Thomas
 The Vicious Circle (1967 film), a Swedish drama film directed by Arne Mattsson
 Chakra / The Vicious Circle, a 1981 Hindi film with Alka Kubal

Other uses 
 The Vicious Circle, another name for Danish band Konkhra
 The Viscous Circle alternate title for Jean-Paul Sartre's play No Exit
 Byuha Chakra (The Vicious Circle), a 1984 novel by Bharat Jangam

See also
 Vicious Circle (disambiguation)